Craig Abrahams (born 27 March 1982) is a South African former cricketer. He played in four first-class and five List A matches for Boland in 2007.

See also
 List of Boland representative cricketers

References

External links
 

1982 births
Living people
South African cricketers
Boland cricketers
People from Wellington, Western Cape
Cricketers from the Western Cape